Julián Lalinde (born 18 December 1985) is a Uruguayan retired footballer who played as a striker.

On 12 December 2019, 34-year old Lalinde announced his retirement.

References

External links

 Profile at BDFA
 

1985 births
Living people
People from Florida Department
Uruguayan footballers
Uruguayan expatriate footballers
Liverpool F.C. (Montevideo) players
Rampla Juniors players
Deportivo Pasto footballers
América de Cali footballers
Independiente Santa Fe footballers
Beijing Sport University F.C. players
S.D. Quito footballers
Unión Comercio footballers
Ferro Carril Oeste footballers
Montevideo City Torque players
C.D. Suchitepéquez players
C.A. Progreso players
Uruguayan Primera División players
Uruguayan Segunda División players
Argentine Primera División players
China League One players
Ecuadorian Serie A players
Liga Nacional de Fútbol de Guatemala players
Categoría Primera A players
Uruguayan expatriate sportspeople in China
Uruguayan expatriate sportspeople in Argentina
Uruguayan expatriate sportspeople in Colombia
Uruguayan expatriate sportspeople in Ecuador
Uruguayan expatriate sportspeople in Guatemala
Uruguayan expatriate sportspeople in Peru
Expatriate footballers in China
Expatriate footballers in Argentina
Expatriate footballers in Colombia
Expatriate footballers in Ecuador
Expatriate footballers in Guatemala
Expatriate footballers in Peru
Association football forwards